Cymolutes is a genus of wrasses native to the Indian and Pacific Oceans.

Species
The currently recognized species in this genus are:
 Cymolutes lecluse (Quoy & Gaimard, 1824) (sharp-headed wrasse)
 Cymolutes praetextatus (Quoy & Gaimard, 1834) (knife razorfish)
 Cymolutes torquatus (Valenciennes, 1840) (finescale razorfish)

References

 
Labridae
Marine fish genera
Taxa named by Albert Günther